Hektor Idrizaj (born 15 April 1989) is an Albanian professional footballer who plays as a defender for Teuta Durrës  in the Albanian Superliga.

Club career

Early career
Idrizaj joined the youth setup of local side Flamurtari Vlorë as an 11 year old in 2000, and he progressed through the ranks at the club and played at under-17 and under-19 level, before leaving in 2008 to sign his first professional contract with Bylis Ballsh. He made his professional debut on 14 September 2008 in a league game against Elbasani, where he came on as a 20th-minute substitute for injured Roland Nenaj in what would be his only appearance in a season that saw Bylis Ballsh get relegated from the Albanian Superliga.

Skënderbeu Korçë
On 24 June 2016, Idrizaj was presented as the new player of Skënderbeu Korçë; he joined on a three-year contract, taking squad number 28. His competitive debut began on 1 October in the championship matchday 5 in Skënderbeu's 3–0 route of against Vllaznia Shkodër. He opened his scoring account four days later in the returning leg of 2016–17 Albanian Cup first round against Butrinti Sarandë which was won a record 8–0. He spent the majority of his spell on bench, making only 11 appearances between league and cup, collecting 711 minutes in total as Skënderbeu finished runner-up in cup and failed to win the championship for the first time in six years. In June 2017, he terminated the contract with the club by mutual consent and become a free agent.

Kamza
On 30 July 2017, Idrizaj completed a transfer to newly promoted top flight side Kamza by penning a contract for the 2017–18 season. He made his competitive debut in the opening week of championship on 9 September versus Kukësi, and became a regular starter afterwards.

Career statistics

References

External links

AFA profile

1989 births
Living people
Footballers from Vlorë
Albanian footballers
Association football defenders
KF Bylis Ballsh players
KF Teuta Durrës players
Flamurtari Vlorë players
KF Skënderbeu Korçë players
FC Kamza players
FK Partizani Tirana players
Kategoria Superiore players